is an animation studio subsidiary of Pierrot. The studio is an associate-member of The Association of Japanese Animations.

History
The company was founded in 1959 as an advertising agency by Keiji Kusano and stepped into the anime industry in 1989. In 1993, the company took on the name Studio Kikan and released their first animated works Shima Shima Tora no Shimajirou. In 1996, the company established Arms as a separate studio to focus on adult animation and subcontracted animation work.

The studio became a subsidiary of Pierrot in 2008 and changed its name to Pierrot Plus in 2009. Kusano stepping down as CEO to become a chairman, and was replaced by CEO of Arms, Osamu Shimizu.

On September 20, 2019, the company changed its name to Studio Signpost. Ken Hagino, who had worked at Pierrot as animation producer was appointed as the new CEO. In conjunction with this change, the official website of Arms was closed down, and the company was later dissolved on October 6, 2020.

Works

Television series

OVAs
 Butt Attack Punisher Girl (1994)
 Butt Attack Punisher Girl R (1994)
 Wild 7 (1994–1995)
 Naisho no Tsubomi (2008, with ARMS)
 Master of Martial Hearts (2008–2009)
 Letter Bee - Light and Blue Night Fantasy (2008)
 Letter Bee Academy (2010)
 Beelzebub: Jump Festa 2010 Special (2010)

References

External links

  

 
Animation studios in Tokyo
Japanese animation studios
Japanese companies established in 1959
Mass media companies established in 1959
Suginami